The Casa da Moeda do Brasil is the Brazilian mint, owned by the Brazilian government and administratively subordinated to the Ministry of Finances. It was established in 1694. Its current headquarters and industrial facilities occupy a modern plant with 110,000 square metres (1.2 million square feet) in Rio de Janeiro's western suburb of Santa Cruz.

It produces legal tender coins and banknotes. It also produces medals and security prints (i.e., passports, subway tokens, postage stamps) that are used and issued by government-run service providers. Having the highest technology and production capacity in South America, until the 1980s it also produced coins, banknotes and passports for several South American and African countries that lacked a similar facility. It is now aiming to return to the foreign market. However, cases of corruption and deficiencies in its products have tarnished its image at the international market.

See also

 Brazilian passport
 Brazilian real

References

External links
 Casa da Moeda do Brasil  

1694 establishments in Brazil
Mints (currency)
Banknote printing companies
Manufacturing companies based in Rio de Janeiro (city)
Organizations established in 1694
Executive branch of Brazil
Government agencies established in the 1690s